Skidmore is a city in western Nodaway County, Missouri, United States. The population was 245 at the 2020 Census.  The small farming community is known for the unsolved murder of Ken Rex McElroy. Skidmore also has a yearly "Punkin' Show."

History
The Skidmore area was first settled in 1840 by William Bunton shortly after the Platte Purchase opened the area to settlement.  Skidmore itself was platted in 1880 when M. Skidmore donated  to the Nodaway Valley Railroad Company (the agent for the Kansas City, St. Joseph and Council Bluffs Railroad which was eventually taken over by the Burlington Northern Railroad).  The railroad no longer operates.

The St. Oswald's Protestant Episcopal Church was listed on the National Register of Historic Places in 1992.

Crime

On July 10, 1981, Ken McElroy was shot to death with at least two different guns while sitting in his truck in front of the D&G Tavern in town. Up to 50 individuals witnessed the event, all of whom denied seeing anything that would help police identify any of the shooters. McElroy's wife saw one of the gunmen and identified him.  The prosecutor took the case to two grand juries, but neither one thought any crime had been committed so there was no indictment. As of 2021, the murder has not been solved and still is considered an open case.  McElroy had a reputation as the "town bully," and he had fended off over 20 charges for acts of theft, rape, and other violence (often by means of witness intimidation). In the months before his death, he was appealing a light sentence for shooting a 70-year-old grocer, Bo Bowenkamp, in the neck. Town residents had been upset over the inability of the courts to deal with him. Author Harry N. MacLean recounted the incident and its background in a bestselling and award-winning book, In Broad Daylight. In 1991 the incident was portrayed in a made-for-TV movie starring Brian Dennehy and Cloris Leachman (although filmed in Texas).  The Ken McElroy shooting was also the focus of the A&E Network program City Confidential, season 2, episode 22 entitled, "Skidmore: Frontier Justice".

On October 16, 2000, Greg N. Dragoo beat and dragged his girlfriend, Wendy Gillenwater, down several country roads outside of Skidmore, causing her to die. Gillenwater's body was found outside her Skidmore home. Dragoo was charged with murder and given a life sentence by a Nodaway County judge. Dragoo is currently incarcerated in the Jefferson City Correctional Center.

On April 11, 2001, Branson Perry vanished under mysterious circumstances from his residence at 304 West Oak Street in Skidmore. Perry's grandmother, Jo Ann, stopped by his home and found the house unlocked and deserted. She found this unusual and called the residence periodically over the next several days, but got no answer. Upon calling Perry's mother, Rebecca Klino, she found she had not spoken to him either. Ground search parties were organized by Nodaway County Sheriff's Office within a 15-mile (24 km) radius of the Perry residence. Numerous fields, farms, and abandoned buildings were searched, but the efforts proved fruitless. His disappearance received national media coverage. Over the following month and a half, over one hundred people were interviewed in Perry's disappearance, but the case remains unsolved. On August 14, 2022, Nodaway County Sheriff Randy Strong announced their department had identified a suspect, but still needed more evidence before making an arrest.

On December 16, 2004, Skidmore was once again the focus of national attention when Bobbie Jo Stinnett, a cousin of Branson Perry, was murdered in her home located at 410 W. Elm Street. She had her unborn baby cut from her womb, which was found alive two days later in Topeka, Kansas, and delivered to the father by police.  The killer, Lisa Montgomery, received a federal death sentence, and was executed early in the morning on January 13, 2021.

Geography
Skidmore is located at on Missouri Route 113 approximately two miles north of the Nodaway-Holt county line. The Nodaway River flows past the west side and the confluence of Florida Creek with the Nodaway is just north of the community. Maryville is approximately eleven miles to the east-northeast.

Demographics

2010 census
As of the census of 2010, there were 284 people, 122 households, and 81 families living in the city. The racial makeup of the city was 99.3% White, 0.4% Native American, and 0.4% from two or more races.

There were 122 households, of which 29.5% had children under the age of 18 living with them, 52.5% were married couples living together, 8.2% had a female householder with no husband present, 5.7% had a male householder with no wife present, and 33.6% were non-families. 27.9% of all households were made up of individuals, and 13.9% had someone living alone who was 65 years of age or older. The average household size was 2.33 and the average family size was 2.80.

The median age in the city was 45.4 years. 21.8% of residents were under the age of 18; 5.6% were between the ages of 18 and 24; 21.7% were from 25 to 44; 32.1% were from 45 to 64; and 18.7% were 65 years of age or older. The gender makeup of the city was 52.8% male and 47.2% female.

2000 census
As of the census of 2000, there were 342 people, 148 households, and 96 families living in the city. The population density was 1,058.8 people per square mile (412.6/km). There were 173 housing units at an average density of 535.6 per square mile (208.7/km). The racial makeup of the city was 99.42% White, 0.29% African American, and 0.29% from two or more races.

There were 148 households, out of which 29.7% had children under the age of 18 living with them, 52.0% were married couples living together, 7.4% had a female householder with no husband present, and 35.1% were non-families. 31.8% of all households were made up of individuals, and 12.8% had someone living alone who was 65 years of age or older. The average household size was 2.31 and the average family size was 2.89.

In the city the population was spread out, with 23.7% under the age of 18, 7.9% from 18 to 24, 26.9% from 25 to 44, 25.7% from 45 to 64, and 15.8% who were 65 years of age or older. The median age was 40 years. For every 100 females there were 102.4 males. For every 100 females age 18 and over, there were 94.8 males.

The median income for a household in the city was $30,500, and the median income for a family was $36,250. Males had a median income of $27,500 versus $20,156 for females. The per capita income for the city was $13,881. About 14.7% of families and 22.1% of the population were below the poverty line, including 36.8% of those under age 18 and 10.9% of those age 65 or over.

Education
Nodaway-Holt R-VII School District is the local school district for the area, with an elementary school in Maitland and a junior-senior high and district headquarters in Graham.

References

External links
 Historic maps of Skidmore in the Sanborn Maps of Missouri Collection at the University of Missouri

Cities in Nodaway County, Missouri
Cities in Missouri